Tegen (Tögüön) is a rural locality (a selo), one of four settlements, in addition to Kyachchi, Kilier and Olom, in Kyachchinsky Rural Okrug of Olyokminsky District in the Sakha Republic, Russia. Its population as of the 2002 Census was 20.

References

Notes

Rural localities in Olyokminsky District